= 1920 North Coast Rugby League season =

1919 North Coast Rugby League season
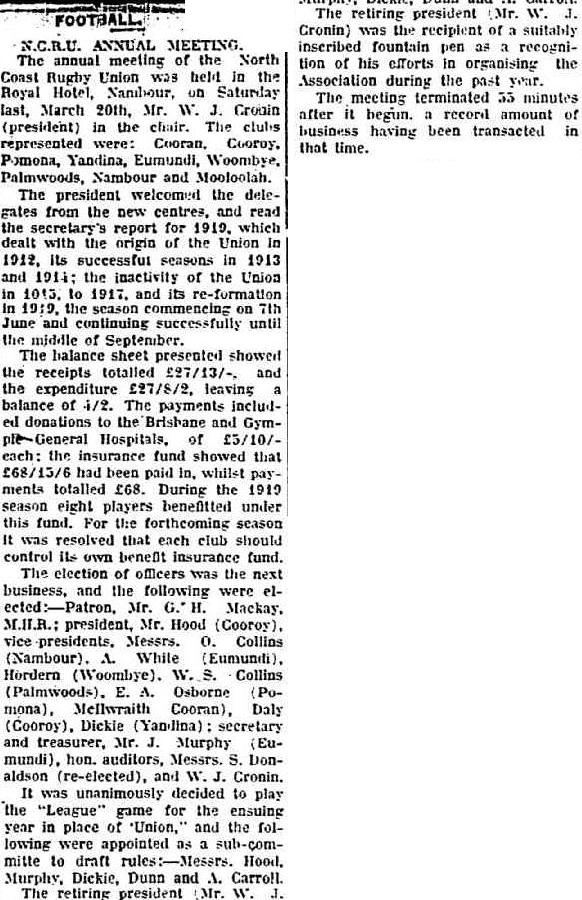
- Article detailing the 1920 annual meeting of the North Coast Rugby Union
- Countries: Australia
- Number of teams: 8

Official website
- rlsc.com.au

The 1920 North Coast Rugby League season was the first season of rugby league football in the area that is now the Sunshine Coast, Queensland, all of the clubs having changed over from rugby union in March 1920.

== Fixtures ==
At a meeting of held at the Royal Hotel, Nambour, on Monday, April 19. fixtures were presented by the committee appointed to do so, and were adopted.

April 24.

- Woombye-Buderim, at Woombye.
- Nambour-Cooran, at Nambour.
- Eumundi-Palmwoods, at Eumundi.
- Yandina-Cooroy, at Yandina.
- Pomona-Mooloolah at Pomona.

May 1.

- Buderim-Eumundi. at Nambour.
- Cooran-Yandina, at Cooran.
- Nambour-Pomona at Nambour.
- Palmwoods-Woombye. at Palmwoods
- Cooroy-Mooloolah, at Cooroy.

May 8.

- Buderim-Pomona, at Nambour.
- Eumundi-Cooran, at Eumundi
- Yandina-Woombye, at Yandina
- Cooroy-Nambour, at Nambour.
- Mooloolah-Palmwoods, at Mooloolah

May 15.

- Mooloolah-Buderim,
- Woombye-Pomona, at Woombye.
- Nambour-Eumundi, at Nambour.
- Cooran-Cooroy, at Cooran.
- Palmwoods-Yandina. at Palmwoods

May 22.

- Buderim-Cooran, at Nambour.
- Yandina-Eumundi, at Yandina.
- Pomona-Palmwoods, at Pomona.
- Mooloolah-Nambour, at Mooloolah.
- Woombye-Cooroy at Woombye.

May 29.

- Nambour-Buderim at Nambour.
- Cooran-Woomhye, at Cooran.
- Cooroy-Palmwoods at Cooroy.
- Eumundi-Mooloolah. at Eumundi.
- Yandina-Pomona. at Yandina.

June 5.

- Buderim-Cooroy, at Nambour.
- Woombye-Nambour, at Woombye.
- Palmwoods-Cooran, at Palmwoods .
- Pomona-Eumundi, at Pomona.
- Mooloolah-Yandina, at Mooloolah

June 12.

- Buderim-Palmwoods. at Buderim.
- Eumundi- Woombye, al Eumundi.
- Nambour- Yandina, at Nambour.
- Cooran-Mooloolah, at Cooran.
- Pomona-Cooroy at Pomona.

June 19.

- Yandina-Buderim at Yandina.
- Cooran-Pomona, at Coonin.
- Cooroy-Eumundi, at Cooroy.
- Woombyc-Mooloolah, at Woombye.
- Palmwoods-ambour, at Palmwoods

July 3.

- Hospital Cup: Woombye-Cooroy, at Cooroy.
- Protest match: Eumundi-Nambour, at Cooroy as a curtain raiser.
